Thibault Giresse (born 25 May 1981) is a French professional football manager and former player who is an assistant coach at  club Nîmes. As a player, he was a midfielder.

Playing career
Giresse signed a two-year contract with Guingamp on 15 June 2009.

Managerial career

On 21 November 2022, Giresse joined Ligue 2 club Nîmes as an assistant coach to newly-appointed head coach Frédéric Bompard, with whom he had worked at Guingamp.

Personal life

He is the son of Alain Giresse.

Honours
Toulouse

 Ligue 2: 2002–03

Guingamp
 Coupe de France: 2013–14

References

External links

1981 births
Living people
People from Talence
Sportspeople from Gironde
Association football midfielders
French footballers
Toulouse FC players
Le Havre AC players
Amiens SC players
En Avant Guingamp players
Ligue 1 players
Ligue 2 players
Championnat National players
Footballers from Nouvelle-Aquitaine
French football managers
Association football coaches
En Avant Guingamp non-playing staff
Nîmes Olympique non-playing staff